Hang Time is a 1988 album from the band Soul Asylum. Released on A&M Records, it was the band's major-label debut.

Singer/guitarist Dave Pirner wrote the majority of the album. Guitarist Dan Murphy chimed in with "Cartoon," released as one of the album's singles. The CD version features the "bone-us" (bonus) track "Put the Bone In", by Terry Jacks.

Track listing 
All songs written by Dave Pirner unless otherwise noted.
"Down on Up to Me" – 2:46
"Little Too Clean" – 3:15
"Sometime to Return" – 3:28
"Cartoon" – 3:52 (Murphy)
"Beggars and Choosers" – 2:57
"Endless Farewell" – 3:21
"Standing in the Doorway" – 3:06
"Marionette" – 3:24
"Ode" – 2:18
"Jack of All Trades" – 2:53
"Twiddly Dee" – 3:00
"Heavy Rotation" – 3:54
"Put the Bone In" – 3:34 (bone-us track, CD Only) (Terry Jacks)

Singles 
"Marionette"
"Little Too Clean"
"Cartoon"

References 

1988 albums
A&M Records albums
Soul Asylum albums
Albums produced by Ed Stasium
Albums produced by Lenny Kaye